Laysha (Hangul: 레이샤) is a South Korean girl group formed by JS Entertainment but is now currently under A1 Entertainment. The group currently consists of four members: Goeun, Chaejin, Sia and Boreum. They debuted on May 12, 2015, with the self-titled single “LAYSHA”. Laysha are known for their risqué concepts when performing.

History

Premiere and Chocolate Cream 
The group debuted on May 12, 2015, with the single "LAYSHA". Initially the group was composed of five members, however, shortly after the group's debut, JS Entertainment announced the departure of members Seulgi and Yoobin. On July 20, 2016, Laysha made their first comeback with the single "Chocolate Cream". Later news released that new members had entered, Hyeri and Choim. The group has since only remain with four members.

Pink Label and Controversy 
On December 18, 2017, Laysha made their second comeback with their single "Pink Label". On August 29, 2018, Laysha got into a controversy when Som and Goeun said cameras were placed in their rooms and bathrooms to spy on them, blaming their company. The public in social media suspected that Laysha had lied about the hidden cameras. Goeun denied the accusations that Laysha was using the controversy over the hidden cameras for marketing purposes.

Members

Current members 
 Goeun (고은) birth name Kim Goeun (김고은) born in Seoul, South Korea on December 26, 1990 – leader, main vocalist, lead dancer and visual (2015–present).
 Chaejin (채진) birth name Kim Chaejin (김채진) born in Seoul, South Korea on April 26, 1991 – main rapper, main dancer and vocalist (2015–present)
 Sia (시아) birth name Kim Sei Hee (김세희) born in Seoul, South Korea in 1995. (2019–present)
 Boreum (보름), birth name Kim Do Young (김도영) born in Busan, South Korea on August 12, 1996. (2019–present)

Former members 

 Choim born Han Cho Im born in South Korea on December 4, 1990. Joined and left in 2015.
 Yoobin born Jung Yoobin born in South Korea on January 15, 1992. Joined and left in 2015.
 Seulgi born Park Seulgi born in South Korea on March 13, 1992. Joined and left in 2015.
 Som born Yang Dasom born in South Korea on May 15, 1990. Joined 2015–2019.
 Hyeri born Yang Hyeri born in South Korea on December 4, 1992. Joined 2015–2019.
 Hayoung born Kim Chae Jin born in South Korea on December 8, 1996. Joined and left in 2019.

Discography 

 Singles

 2015: LAYSHA
 2015: Turn up the Music
 2016: Party Tonight
 2016: Chocolate Cream
 2017: Pink Label
 2019: FREEDOM (프리덤)

Videography 
Videoclips

References

External links 

 
 

Musical groups from Seoul
Musical groups established in 2015
K-pop music groups
South Korean girl groups
South Korean dance music groups